Cook Me the Money is a British daytime television programme on ITV as part of ITV Food presented by Adam Shaw and produced by Shiver Productions.

Each episode sees three teams of amateur chefs creating, and selling a dish of their choice. They must create a pop-up business by selling their dish to paying customers. They have £100 and fifteen minutes to spend on shopping for their ingredients, followed by one hour to make the dish and set the price. The winning team takes all of their own profit and the earnings from the other teams, home. The show is split up into three sections, the first section is meeting the teams, the second is watching the teams shop, and the last section of the show is watching the teams cook and decide a price for the dish they made.

References

External links

2010s British cooking television series
2010s British game shows
2013 British television series debuts
2013 British television series endings
British cooking television shows
ITV game shows
Television series by ITV Studios
English-language television shows